Ramayan is an Indian television series depicting the story of Rama and based on stories from classic Indian literature. The 2008 release is a reboot of the 1987 Ramayan television series of the same name. The plot derives from Valmiki's Ramayan, Tulsidas's Ramcharitmanas and Chakbasta's Urdu Ramayan with aspects of other works. The television series was produced by Sagar Arts and aired on NDTV Imagine. This Show Was Re-Aired On Dangal TV while the entire episodes of this show can be watched on Dangal Play app.

Synopsis

Ramayan tells the story of Rama, the eldest son of Dasharatha, the King of Ayodhya. Rama is due to become king after his father's retirement, but his stepmother, Kaikeyi wants her son Bharat to take the throne.

As King Dashratha had earlier promised to fulfill any two wishes for her, Kaikeyi demands that Rama should be banished to the forest for fourteen years and that Bharat should be crowned as king. Dasharatha keeps his word and with a heavy heart asks Rama to leave for the forest. Rama accepts the exile and is accompanied by his wife Sita and younger brother Lakshmana. When Bharat learns that his mother is responsible for Rama's exile he renounces her and beseeches Rama to return to Ayodhya. Rama declines, whereupon Bharat places Rama's paduka on the throne as a symbol that Rama is the true king.

Bharat served Ayodhya for the next fourteen years keeping Paduka of Rama on the throne. Ravan, the evil King of Lanka, abducts Sita, prompting Rama, Lakshmana, Hanuman and his army of apes, the Vanara Sena, to rescue her and Rama to kill Ravan.

Season 2 focuses on Ram-Sita's life after returning from exile, the birth of Luv-Kush, their reunion with the royal family and final departure of Sita and Ram from the earth.

Cast

Additional cast
Avinash Mukherjee as Young Bharat
 Harsh Somaiya as Young Shatrughan
Richa Mukherjee as Young Shrutakirti
Manish Arora as Devantaka, son of Ravana
 Aziz Ansari as Bali, Sugriv's brother and King of Kishkindha / also Sugriv, a friend of Lord Rama and the King of Kishkindha
 Brownie Parasher as Vashishtha, guru of the four brothers
 Raman Khatri as Kubera/Valmiki, a sage who composed Ramayan, story of Lord Ram
 Romanch Mehta as Narantaka, son of Ravana/Lavanasura, nephew of Ravana 
 Nitin Joshi as Atikaya, son of Ravana 
Milind Soman as Malyavan
Amit Pachori as Lord Shiva
Radha Krishna Dutt as King Sagara
Falguni Rajani as Shurpanakha, Ravan's sister
Neha Bam as Kaikasi, Ravan's mother
 Sanjeev Siddharth as Ahiravana, brother of Ravana
Khushabu Duggal as Malvika, Maid and Friend of Sita in Mithila
 Arun Mathur as Sumali, grandfather of Ravana

Production
Omang Kumar designed the sets and Nisha Sagar designed the costumes. Anand Sagar, son of late Ramanand Sagar, directed the series having worked on the script for about six months with this team. The series was shot at "Sagar Film City" in Baroda (now Vadodara).

Speaking about getting the role of Sita Deblina Bonnerjee said, " I auditioned for a television show but, after that, I didn't want to do it. After some time, I auditioned for a mythological show for Sagar productions but I didn't know it was for Ramayan. I was selected and realised, during the mock rehearsals, that I was playing Sita."

Speaking about his training, Gurmeet Choudhary said, "I had to build six-pack abs and do strength training. Also, since the producers didn’t want the next-gen Ram to sport a wig – that would have looked too cosmetic in today’s day and age – I grew my hair for one-and-a-half years."

About  of flowers were brought from Mumbai to the sets at Baroda daily for the sequence of Ram and Sita's marriage.

Music
Ravindra Jain, who composed music for the 1980s series returned as a composer. Playback singers included Kavita Subramaniam and Suresh Wadkar. An audio CD with 17 bhajans from the series was released in 2009 with lyrics/music by Jain and the voices of singers Suresh Wadkar, Kavita Subramaniam, Sadhana Sargam, Satish Dehra, Pamela Jain, Ravi Tripathi, Amaya Daate, Rekha Rao, Prem Prakash, Kuldeep, Subhash Srivastav, Sanket, and the composer himself.

Reception
The show had an average opening with a rating of 1.8 TVR in the premiere day and overall 1.5 TVR in its opening week and in a month peaked 3.19 TVR. Within three months, it became one of the most watched Hindi GEC garnering 5.2 TVR, increasing the viewership of the channel to third position after StarPlus and Zee TV. In May 2008, it averaged 1.60 TVR before which it peaked with 3.9 TVR in March 2008.

Dubbed versions

The series was dubbed in Malayalam on Surya TV, featuring songs sung by Unni Menon, in Tamil on Sun TV from 2008 to 2010, in Telugu on Gemini TV. The Gujarati version aired on ETV Gujarati.

References

External links
Ramayan on Dangal Play 
Ramayan (2008) on IMDb
Ramayan Official Site
 Ramayan Title Track
 Collection Of Ramayan Songs & Musics

2008 Indian television series debuts
Imagine TV original programming
Television shows based on poems
Television series based on the Ramayana
2009 Indian television series endings